The Harihar Temple is located on the banks of the Narayani River in Narayangarh, Chitwan in Bharatpur, Nepal. Established in 1971, it is one of the busiest temples in the city during the marriage season.

References 

Hindu temples in Bagmati Province
Chitwan District
1971 establishments in Nepal
Buildings and structures in Bharatpur, Nepal